The Pacific bluefin tuna (Thunnus orientalis) is a predatory species of tuna found widely in the northern Pacific Ocean, but it is migratory and also recorded as a visitor to the south Pacific.

In the past it was often included in T. thynnus, the 'combined' species then known as the northern bluefin tuna (when treated as separate, T. thynnus is called the Atlantic bluefin tuna).

Like the closely related Atlantic bluefin and southern bluefin, the Pacific bluefin is a commercially valuable species and several thousand tonnes are caught each year, making it overfished. It is considered threatened by the IUCN and PEW. Monterey Bay Aquarium's Seafood Watch program have placed all bluefin tunas on the "Avoid" list and they are also placed on the "Red List" by Greenpeace and the Blue Ocean Institute.

Distribution
The Pacific bluefin tuna is primarily found in the North Pacific, ranging from the East Asian coast to the western coast of North America. It is mainly a pelagic species found in temperate oceans, but it also ranges into the tropics and more coastal regions.

It spawns in the northwestern Philippine Sea (e.g., off Honshu, Okinawa and Taiwan) and in the Sea of Japan. Some of these migrate to the East Pacific and return to the spawning grounds after a few years. It has been recorded more locally as a visitor to the Southern Hemisphere, including off Australia, New Zealand, the Gulf of Papua and French Polynesia.

The species is considered to consist of only one stock.

Physiology

Thermoregulation
Almost all fish are cold-blooded (ectothermic). However, tuna and mackerel sharks are warm-blooded: they can regulate their body temperature. Warm-blooded fish possess organs near their muscles called retia mirabilia that consist of a series of minute parallel veins and arteries that supply and drain the muscles. As the warmer blood in the veins returns to the gills for fresh oxygen it comes into close contact with cold, newly oxygenated blood in the arteries. The system acts as a counter-current heat exchanger and the heat from the blood in the veins is given up to the colder arterial blood rather than being lost at the gills. The net effect is less heat loss through the gills. Fish from warmer water elevate their temperature a few degrees whereas those from cold water may raise it as much as  warmer than the surrounding sea.

The tuna's ability to maintain body temperature has several definite advantages over other sea life. It need not limit its range according to water temperature, nor is it dominated by climatic changes. The additional heat supplied to the muscles is also advantageous because of the resulting extra power and speed.

Life cycle
Pacific bluefin tunas reach maturity at about 5 years of age, the generation length is estimated at 7–9 years and based on two separate sources the longevity is 15 years or 26 years. Elsewhere, a mass of up to  has been reported for the species. According to the International Game Fish Association, the all-tackle game fish record was a  individual (Donna Pascoe) caught on 19 February 2014 onboard charter boat Gladiator during the National Tournament.

Spawning occurs from April to August, but the exact timing depends on the region: Early in the northwest Philippine Sea (the southern part of its breeding range) and late in the Sea of Japan (the northern part of its breeding range). Large females can carry more eggs than small ones, and between 5 million and 25 million eggs have been reported.

Pacific bluefins eat various small schooling squids and fishes, but have also been recorded taking sessile animals, pelagic red crabs and krill.

Human interaction

Commercial fishery

Pacific bluefin tuna support a large commercial fishery.

Aquaculture
Japan is both the biggest consumer and the leader in tuna farming research. Kinki University of Japan first successfully farmed already-hatched bluefin tuna in 1979. In 2002, they succeeded in breeding them, and in 2007, the process was repeated for a third generation. This farm-raised tuna is now known as Kindai tuna. Kindai is a contraction of Kinki University (Kinki daigaku).

Conservation
Unlike the other bluefins (Atlantic and southern), the Pacific bluefin tuna was not considered threatened initially, resulting in a Least Concern rating in 2011. In 2014, it was found to be threatened and the status was changed to Vulnerable. Overfishing is occurring in the Pacific bluefin, but overall the stock was not yet believed to be in an overfished condition in 2011.

According to stock assessments completed in 2011, 2014 and 2016 by the International Scientific Committee for Tuna and Tuna-Like Species in the North Pacific Ocean (ISC), the present-day population is at just 2.6 percent of its historic levels. The overall fishing mortality rate for this species remains up to three times higher than is sustainable.

In 2010, it was estimated that the complete spawning biomass was 40–60% of the historically observed spawning biomass. In 2000–2004, between 16,000 tonnes and 29,000 tonnes were caught per year.

Its wide range and migratory behavior lead to some problems, since fisheries in the species are managed by several different Regional Fisheries Management Organisations that sometimes give conflicting advice. The IUCN have recommended that the responsibility be moved to a single organisation. Other recommendations include a substantial reduction of fishing of this species, especially juveniles. As much as 90% of the caught Pacific bluefins are juveniles.

Monterey Bay Aquarium's Seafood Watch program have placed all bluefin tunas on the "Avoid" list, and they are also placed on the "Red List" by both Greenpeace and the Blue Ocean Institute.

Mercury levels

Pacific bluefin flesh may contain levels of mercury or PCBs that are harmful to humans who consume it. A similar problem exists in other tuna species.

Cuisine
About 80% of the Pacific and Atlantic bluefin tunas are consumed in Japan, and tunas that are particularly suited for sashimi and sushi can fetch very high prices. In Japan, some foods made available for the first time of the year are considered good luck, especially bluefin tuna. Winning these new year auctions is often used as a way to get publicity, which raises the prices considerably higher than their usual market value: on 5 January 2013, a  Pacific bluefin tuna caught off northeastern Japan was sold in the first auction of the year at the Tsukiji fish market in Tokyo for a record 155.4 million yen (US$1.76 million) – leading to record unit prices of US$3,603 per pound, or ¥703,167 per kilogram. A  pacific bluefin tuna sold for 333.6 million yen (US$3.1 million) at a Tokyo fish market on 5 January 2019. The price equates to roughly $5,000 a pound, close to double the previous record. The fish was caught off Oma in northern Japan.

References

External links

 Encyclopedia of Life
 TOPP, Tagging of Pacific Predators, a research group that tags and tracks the amazing Pacific bluefin tuna to learn more about it. The site features information, photos, blog posts and multimedia stories about the bluefin tuna.
 Pew Charitable Trusts, new data (1/2013) shows that the population of Pacific bluefin is a small fraction of what it used to be, and is in danger of all but disappearing, - actually the Pacific Bluefin Tuna Population is down over 96%
 

Fish described in 1844
Taxa named by Coenraad Jacob Temminck
Taxa named by Hermann Schlegel
Commercial fish
Thunnus